Therazhundur Venkataraman Mahalingam (c. 1907 - 6 March 1983) was an Indian historian who is known for publishing the most authoritative descriptive catalogues on the Mackenzie manuscripts.

Early life 

Mahalingam was born in Therazhundur in Tanjore district in 1907.   Following his graduation, Mahalingam worked as a lecturer in the Madurai College and later at the H. H. The Rajah's College in Pudukkottai. In 1947, Mahalingam joined the faculty of the Department of Ancient History and Archeology, as the Professor of Ancient History and Archeology at the University of Madras.

As University of Madras faculty 

Mahalingam worked as a history professor under the leadership of K. K. Pillay till 1959. When the Department of Indian history and archaeology was split into two new departments - Department of Indian History and Department of Ancient History and Archaeology in 1959, Pillay remained head of the Indian history department while Mahalingam was promoted to head the newly created Department of Ancient History and Archaeology, a post which he held to retirement in 1971.

Death 

Mahalingam died on 6 March 1983 at the age of 75.

Honours 

Mahalingam was awarded the Padma Shri by the Government of India in 1969.

Works

Notes 

1900s births
1983 deaths
20th-century Indian historians
Recipients of the Padma Shri in science & engineering
Academic staff of the University of Madras